Avret Pazarları (Ottoman Turkish پازار Avret Pazarları) or simply Esir Bazar was a market of women slaves located in Istanbul, in then Ottoman Empire (now Turkey) between the mid 15th-century and the early 20th-century.

The general slave trade of men and women was referred to as Esir Pazari. According to Robert C. Davis, although women slaves were mainly taken from war zones, referring to them as captives or prisoners of war was blatantly incorrect. It is significant to note that the women's religion was not the same as that of their captors, and most of them were not active combatants but were taken while going about their normal business as civilians, despite any sign of hostility. The women were captured from various African, Asian, and European territories and sold in Istanbul markets. Madeline Zilfi maintains that, like male slaves, female slaves were considered the personal property of their owners. However, unlike their male counterparts, women slaves were permitted to be exploited sexually, and their sexuality was deemed to be the personal property of their owners. Although using female slaves for prostitution was technically illegal, selling a slave woman to another man for sex was permissible, and slave women had no legal protection over their sexuality. Zilfi explains that while slaves could seek recourse to Islamic Sharia courts for any other physical injury, the sexuality of women slaves was not their own to lose. As a result, they were unable to appeal to Sharia courts or Sultans. Under systemic biases introduced under the Ottoman judicial system, enslaved women, most of whom were non-Muslims, were barred from testifying as witnesses against Muslims. The loss of a slave's virginity was not a matter for herself but rather for her owner, unlike physical injuries to a woman slave by a non-owner, for example, to the arm, leg, eye, or other part of the body. For instance, in the winter of 1817 AD, a female slave owner received compensation through the courts from a man who had raped her slave because the woman's virginity had been compromised, and it would no longer be possible for her owner to sell her as a highly-priced virgin.

According to Zilfi, the literature on slavery-related Fatwa, covering Ottoman legal commentaries, is full of discussions about past, present, and future access to female slaves' sexuality. Queries were asked and answered about disputed paternity, prostitution, adultery, joint ownership of slaves, childbirth, marriage, violation of woman slaves by those other than the owner, and sexual relations with a wife's slave woman without the wife's consent. Muftis used to hold special authority as religious opinion givers, given that the interface between a slave's condition and the domestic household was problematic.

While some intellectuals dispute whether those deemed slaves would have been considered as such under our understanding of western slavery, Ehud R. Toledano, Liat Kozma, and Suraiya Faroqhi reveal that there were cases in which enslaved women were abused and deprived of legal protection and their rights. Faroqhi explains that while some historians attempt to contest contrasting law and society, law depends on society, and Islamic law and culture include provisions for the enslaved, facilitating their societal absorption over the generations. Nevertheless, although application and practice may not be universal, those in power impose legal systems to obtain significant advantage for themselves. When viewed from the perspective of disadvantaged slaves, it is reasonable to assume that a legal system is being imposed from outside on the micro-society of the enslaved.

Finally, in the case of Ottoman Legal System in regards to slavery, individual rights to choice and consent were severely restrained. Abuse and limitations were frequent, and female slaves were reduced to the level of material possessions, to be listed in inheritance registers alongside household utensils or livestock, or given such physical descriptions in court. Nineteenth century European women visitors reported that slave women had an astonishingly large amount of leisure time and freedom of speech and action inside the harem. They saw the slaves’ lives as preferable to those of domestic servants in the West.

History and context 

According to Jane Hathaway, a sizable majority of the slaves traded in the Arab slave trade were often women; every substantial household and many less substantial households owned female slaves, including many as domestic servants. In history as well as in conventional scholarship on Ottoman historiography, non-elite slaves and women are far underrepresented.  
        

According to Ehud R. Toledano, the Ottoman Empire followed the same path of enslavement as of other enslavers in general and their predecessor Islamic states in particular, especially the Caliphates of Al-Mu'tasim and Mamluk Sultanate. Taledano says that while various Muslim societies had developed their own brand of enslavement, the legal essence was very much derived from Islamic law. Taledano says harem slavery was a central component of early modern Ottoman imperial and elite households.

          
In 1453 AD, Constantinople (Istanbul) became the capital of the Ottoman Empire. Over the centuries, it became the capital of forced captive slaves that included women. According to Taledano, during the 15th through 18th centuries, a large pool of women captives were brought in as loot of the war from various war fronts including Europeans including Greeks and Balkans from northeast shores of Mediterranean seas and also southeastern European lands lying north of the Black Sea i.e. Georgia and Circassia. These captives became forced labor including the concubinage of elite and royal harems of Ottoman sultans. According to Taledano, in contrast to the Atlantic slave trade where the male-female ratio was 2:1 or 3:1, the Arab slave trade usually had a higher female:male ratio instead, suggesting a general preference for female slaves. Concubinage and reproduction served as incentives for importing female slaves (often European), although many were also imported mainly for performing household tasks.

According to Robert C. Davis, in the 16th century, Avret Pazary was in full swing and doing strong business. Davis estimates demand and market of female slaves capturing and enslavement figure above a thousand per year, in the Ottoman Empire. The slave women market used to be filled with women captured from Corsairs, Tartars and miscellaneous slave dealers.

According to Taledano, slaves usually would not come on record unless reported by their masters, usually for absconding, so while knowing the exact number and composition of slaves remains difficult, analysis of 16th-century absconders presented by Yvonne Seng from Ottoman records shows that some were captured in Ottoman war campaigns in the Balkans, while many others were captured from Russia and Poland by the Crimean Khanate incursions there. Among absconding slaves, 39 percent were Russians, Serbs-Croats 31 percent, Bosnians 11 percent, and the remaining 19 percent from Hungary Bulgaria and Walachia.

According to Davis, Ottaviano Bon, an early 17th-century Italian ambassador, made observations about Avret Pizary of Istanbul: 

Davis further quotes Bon as saying that slave girls in Istanbul were bought and sold like animals – ascertaining their country of origin, plus examining their bodies all over thoroughly to confirm that their buyer did not feel swindled. Virgin and beautiful girls used to get higher prices, and traders used to be held guilty if the slave girl did not turn out to be a virgin after promising so. While Turkish free women i.e. Muslim women could not be enslaved and Muslim Turkish women had some level of legal prerogative against sexual exploitation through slavery, the same prerogative was not available to slaves against the sexual whims of their masters buying and selling them for sexual whims, and such sexual exploitation of female slaves could not be punished legally. According to Davis, by 1717, Lady Mary, wife of a British ambassador to Istanbul, reported in her later published letter that the women slave market of Istanbul was somewhat dwindling.

The slave market was under the supervision of the Ottoman state, which taxed every transaction of slaves. The official control of the slave market was executed by an official called esirci emini. A standard fee or the 1/40th of the value of the slave was imposed as tax. A guild of slave merchants existed (esirci esnafi), headed by a sheikh (esirci seyhi). He was elected by the members of the guild (esnaf) and was appointed by a sultanic decree. Apart from Muslims, Jews were also involved in the slave market, but it is not known whether they were organized in guilds (Sarris, 1990: 336, 337). As per Elviya Celebi memoir, slave traders' guild esirci esnafi had around 2000 members, and their shops had slave rooms.

Limitations of enslaved women
As Suraiya Faroqhi says, female slaves would have few possibilities, depending upon physical attributes such as beauty and natural skills of pleasure and entertaining of male counterparts with cajoling words and gestures, to be selected by elite men as slaves or concubines. Few would be selected as slaves for the imperial harem, a few of them would be gifted to other elite men, a few more physically attractive ones would get selected for royal males, then few attractive ones would be reserved for the pleasure of the Sultan himself, a few of them will be selected as concubines of the Sultan. Those who would issue a male child from the Sultan will receive some extra facilities, but if the slave lady does not convert to Islam then she will be bereft of her child and the child would be raised separately as a Muslim. A rare few of the concubines would have a chance to be selected as an official wife of the Sultan, and rarer would have a chance of being a beloved wife, then rarer among them if her child gets selected as Sultan, would have the best possible honor of being Walide (Mother) of the Sultan.

According to Lidia Zhigunova, during the Ottoman period, women in the Caucasus had to face a multiplicity of colonizing agents, the westerners' and Russians' narratives focused on stereotypes of beauty and sexuality of elite Circassian slave women and their perceived emancipation and attempted to ignore their agency and other facets like their voices, resistance and diversity. Zhigunova quotes Tlostanova to describe possibilities of agencies for Ottoman women slaves. They (Zhigunova, Tlostanova) say that (unlike western slavery) slave status of Ottomans did not rob rights and humanity of the slaves, absorbed and integrated into the society better, there was a chance of change of status from non-elite to elite, for women slaves it was easier through possibilities of marriage. An enslaved woman impregnated by her owner could not be easily resold, her children were considered free, and if the owner accepted they were his children, the same inheritance rights applied as if children were from a legitimate marriage. So over next several generations of slaves were easily absorbed and integrated into the society like other earlier similarly integrated members. Moreover, female slaves would become free after the death of their owners through mechanism known as tedbir, a declaration wherein a slave owner would promise to manumit slave prior to his death to avail religious points of good behavior. At times in the nineteenth century, the Ottoman state encouraged Mukatebe contracts wherein slaves could save to buy their own manumission. However, Zhigunova notes that there used to be repeated instances of women slave abuse, too. According to one example cited by Ehud Toledano, on 30 June 1854 a Circassian slave woman of poor background, named Shemsigul, recorded her testimony with Cairo police. According to her testimony, she was first trafficked from her native village in Circassia to Istanbul where she was purchased by a slave trader named Deli Mehmet, who on the way to Cairo sexually forced himself on her and subsequently, despite her getting pregnant from him, the trader sold her to a son of Egypt's then-Governor Mehmet Ali Pasha and subsequently was resold many times during her pregnancy itself, and even attempted to abort her. But eventually she gave birth to a child and the child was adopted by the wife of Deli Mehmet and she was resold to another dealer—even while the reselling of a slave mother was illegal even by Islamic standards—so the persecuting dealer Deli Mehmet was duly convicted. Toledano's study further says that the trafficking of Circassian women was well established by the nineteenth century, getting an additional dimension when, from the 1850s onwards, Russians expelled Circassians en masse from their own territories. The Circasians sought refuge with the Ottomans at the cost of being slaves. When rates of white slave women went down, black slave women were dumped. Sudden dumping or sudden manumission without any other recourse could lead to slave women's further destitution.

Suraiya Faroqhi compares agency to slaves of Ottoman in comparison to contemporary slaves of Mughal empire in South Asia. According to Faroqhi, no doubt, slave women of the Ottoman Empire had better chances of agency if they chanced upon elite masters, whereas in an attempt to ensure better life for own daughters, elites of Mughal empire used to precondition marriage contracts so that legally wedded wives had rights to dispose of husband's slave women and concubine as and when they wanted and add that amount to own kitty. Thus, they could get rid of any eventual competition from any concubine. Whereas Ottoman women did not take as much recourse to this strategy, they used to end up in familial jealousy wars and risked being dumped by husbands if any slave woman or concubine found better favor. So in Ottoman times, agency, if any, of any slave woman used to be achieved at the cost of other women's agency. Faroqhi says that, whether any other law or Sharia, in slave holding society, for slaves, capacity to show initiative and gain any agency remains limited by law or otherwise. For example, the mechanism of tedbir could prove riskier in achieving meaningful liberation on death of the owner, since the owner could not dispose of his two-thirds property which would get divided among decedent's inheritors, who could claim that (property) value of the slave was too high which owner could not dispose of in full so inheritors continue to have ownership rights over the slave.

Rather than imposing a binary whether Ottoman slaves were slaves or not, Faroqhi prefers to categorize them in a larger spectrum, wherein few of the elite male slaves growing through their military or administrative careers, enjoying most of practical life full of freedoms, wealth and power may not necessarily be called as slaves at all in the western sense but just next to them elite harem women slaves might have shared wealth and even power in some cases but considerable freedoms were alluding from them, too. But non-elite, i.e menial slaves suffered the most from legal disabilities and reduced life chances that we associate with slavery. Faroqhi further points out that Farhat Yasa's study of 16th-18th Centuries fatwas claims under certain circumstances that slave owners could kill their slaves without worrying about being punishment while alive in living world, meaning thereby when one focuses on agency availed by few privileged ones, one ought to acknowledge most female slaves could show their agency only in very narrow limits, if at all. Some female slaves could turn out to be mere facade and slave users using them to face court punishments against their own crimes, too. So under the same spectrum talking of any agency of mere helpless victim female slaves would not remain relevant at all.

According to Kate Fleet, female slaves had more likelihood of access to public spaces as compared to non-slave Ottoman Muslim women. In fact, elite women usually had to take their female slaves along with them if a close male relative was not there to accompany them in public spaces. At times female slaves used to get some amount of agency as informant or spies. More often than not, access to public spaces for female slaves was not dignified.

Fleet says the visibility of female slaves was always meant to be fluid, since she would quickly move from one level of visibility to another, from being a protected possession to an exposed commodity withouts any choice over the levels to which they could be displayed to public gaze, could be handled naked by customers in the slave market, or from household servant to prostitute at the whim of their owners.

Geographies, locations and economics  

East European Crimean Khanate had the largest share in conducting raids, captivating and indulging in exporting East European slaves and fulfilling the demands of Ottoman Empire and beyond. The slave trade and enslaving and ransoming had become an important source of tax revenue for Crimean Khanate and Ottoman Empire both. On one hand, the Islamic tradition of frequent religious manumission used to set a large number of slaves free but on the other hand, the same culture used to create new continued demand for slaves. As with Islam, Jewish slave traders used to have their own religious restrictions wherein once a slave owner has sexual relations with his female slave, he either had to sell the slave or manumit them—again the trader would be adding to new demand for the slaves. This Ottoman practice at times used to increase population leading to economic pressure—even leading to revolts though they were successfully suppressed. Large numbers of manumitted slaves used to end up in begging or giving back in slavery due to non-availability of any other recourse.

The Circassians, Syrians, and Nubians were the three primary races of females who were sold as sex slaves (Cariye) in the Ottoman Empire. Circassian girls were described as fair and light-skinned and were frequently enslaved by Crimean Tatars then sold to Ottoman Empire to live and serve in a harem. They were the most expensive, reaching up to 500 pounds sterling, and the most popular with the Turks. Second in popularity were Syrian girls, with their dark eyes, dark hair, and light brown skin, and came largely from coastal regions in Anatolia. Their price could reach up to 30 pounds sterling. They were described as having "good figures when young". Nubian girls were the cheapest and least popular, fetching up to 20 pounds sterling. Sex roles and symbolism in Ottoman society functioned as a normal action of power. The palace harem excluded enslaved women from the rest of society.

The Ottomans' slave trade to South Asia was to and fro in both directions, but by comparison with the South Asia Uzbec slave trade, it was marginal—still catering demand of white female slaves in elite South Asian harems on the other hand South Asian markets used to fulfill the demand of non-Muslim female slaves.

Avret Pazari of Istabul at Forum of Arcadius

Avret Pazari of Istanbul was located near the Forum of Arcadius. A small mosque to the west of Avret Bazaar bears the name Isa Kapoussi Mesdjidi, while the adjoining street is called Isa Kapoussi Sokaki. The journey Hobhouse describes took place in 1809–10, and so the "last rebellion" must refer to the Ottoman coups of 1807–08, in particular Kabakçı Mustafa's rebellion of 1807. Apparently the "Aurat-Bazar" that Hobhouse reported to have been burnt down before 1810 was rebuilt on the same spot, as we can deduce from the 1839 book Constantinople and the Scenery of the Seven Churches of Asia Minor. It describes the "Aurut Bazaar" as standing "near the burnt column". That this refers to the Column of Arcadius is clear from an earlier book by Walsh (who was an abolitionist), A Residence at Constantinople. The same book specifically identifies the "Aurut Bazaar" as "[t]he usual place where Circassian slaves are sold". The English novellist Julia Pardoe described the Istanbul slave market in her 1837 visit as, a square court three of whose side are built round with low stone rooms, or cells beyond which projects a wooden peristyle.

Other locations 
There is a street in Gaziantep that is named Avrat Pazarı, the street name of the narrow street where the Old Municipality and Şıra Inn are located, north of İnönü Street, which runs parallel to the street starting right across the west-facing door of Kemikli Bedestens, and opens to Şıhcan Street. Other Ottoman cities, such as Belgrade, Sophia, Damascus, Aleppo also had slave markets.

Captures, retrievals, escapes and flights

George of Hungary
George of Hungary ( 1422–1502) was an Ottoman slave taken prisoner and sold into slavery when the Ottoman Turks invaded the town of Mühlbach (now Sebeș) in 1438. George escaped and reverted from Islam to Christianity, writing afterwards about his experiences.

Emily Ruete
There is a lack of (non-elite) slave narratives or folk literature of Circassian women. Emily Ruete's description of kidnapping and enslavement of her mother 'Jilfidan' is one of the closest available testimonies about a captive female slave. Until Ruete's mother was sold to her father, she was a common (non-elite) slave but when purchased by Ruete's father she became an elite slave, i.e. a concubine. Ruete wrote about the captivity of her mother 'Jilfidan':

...My mother was a Circassian by birth, who in early youth had been torn away from her home. Her father had been a farmer, and she had always lived peacefully with her parents and her little brother and sister. War broke out suddenly, and the country was overrun by marauding bands ; on their approach the family fled into an underground place, as my mother called it — she probably meant a cellar, which is not known in Zanzibar. Their place of refuge was, however, invaded by a merciless horde, the parents were slain, and the children carried off by three mounted Arnauts. One of these, with her elder brother, soon disappeared out of sight; the other two, with my mother and her little sister, three years old, crying bitterly for her mother, kept together until evening,when they too parted, and my mother never heard any more of the lost ones as long as she lived.

She came into my father's possession when quite a child, probably at the tender age of seven or eight years, as she cast her first tooth in our house...

Margaret Himfi
The Hungarian noblewoman Margaret Himfi was abducted and enslaved by Ottoman marauders at the turn of the 14th and 15th centuries. She later became a slave mistress of a wealthy Venetian citizen of Crete, with whom she had two daughters. Margaret was able to return to Hungary in 1405.

During one of the first Ottoman incursions at the borderland of the Kingdom of Hungary, Margaret was abducted from the family seat, the village of Egerszeg in Temes County (today part of Vermeș in Romania). As Margaret was found by 1405 and she had two underage children. Sometimes before 1405, Margaret was sold in Crete which then was an overseas colony of the Republic of Venice under the name Kingdom of Candia. She became a slave mistress of a wealthy citizen, Giorgio Darvasio, who came from a Venetian merchant family. Margaret had two daughters from his slave master; Marieta and Iacoba, who were still minors in 1405 and even in 1408. According to that charter which narrated Margaret's story, the lady was well treated by his slave master and lover Darvasio during her captivity. Thus he was possibly attached to her emotionally. Despite her relative good fate in Darvasio's estate, Margaret never gave up her intention to return to Hungary. On 1 July 1405, a charter was issued on Crete in the case of the noblewoman. Darvasio agreed to release her without any ransom and also took an escort for her mistress. Initially he wanted one of their daughters to stay on Crete, but later his only condition was occasional visit opportunity to Hungary to see her former slave and their two children. In the charter, Marcali expressed his intention to return to Crete for Margaret and the two children. Darvasio transferred Margaret and their daughters to Venice in order to travel to Hungary. There he hand them over to Margaret's alleged brother-in-law John of Redel, and also covered her travel expenses. Margaret was able to return to Hungary after lengthy years and resided in Buda with her children.

Other examples
In 1460s Ilona from Garai, wife of Tamas who was taken captive could only escape at an opportune moment but when recaptured she was eventually resold by Serbs five times before she managed to escape sucessfully again. Similarly in 1471, one Anna Nagy escaped from captivity, but these are exceptions. Several women could not be found again even where families or the state was able to arrange for ransom and most could not afford ransom.

Travelers' descriptions 
1592: Lorenzo Bernardo, Venetian Ambassador:

Evliya Çelebi (1611–1682) was 17th century Ottoman traveler who him self participated in some raids and taking captives, writes from his travels from Crimean Khanate (one of largest slave captivator and suppliers to Ottomans):

Robert Walsh, a writer of Irish descent who in his later career campaigned against slavery, was the chaplain to the British Embassy at Istanbul from roughly from 1820 to 1827 witnessed and described condition of then fresh enslavement of Sciote (Chios) post the 1822 Chios massacre from nearby Greek majority island by Ottomans.

Danish author Hans Christian Andersen visited Istanbul in April 1841, and wrote:

Reflection in folk songs 

Many Russian, Ukrainian, and Polish folk songs from Ottoman Empire era reflect the impact of the raids on common people in Eastern Europe and Black sea regions.

In Claude Fauriel's Greek folk songs collection, published in 1824–25, there are some songs mentioning Greeks slaves of the Turks, or the danger of one becoming a slave and fighting to avoid it. These songs refer to pre-revolution events (before 1821), mainly the wars of Souli against Ali Pasha of Jannina and Albanian Muslims. Despo, the wife of Souliote chieftain Tzavellas, is one of the heroines of the songs, committing an honor suicide with other women before they all get captives and slaves. When women and children got surrounded by the enemy in a small fortress, with no chance of escape, Despo sets fire to the gun-powder keg: The original Greek with French translation can be found in Fauriel work.

In popular culture 
Literary depiction of female slavery issues as such begins in 19th-century Ottoman Turkish novels. According to Elif Aksit, while Samipaşazade Sezai, Ahmet Mithat and Halit Ziya elaborate the tragic lives of passive slave girls, Fatma Aliye focuses empowerment even from slavery. The approaches of the first three authors indicates a choice to depict tragicized and caricatured situations to create strong emotional appeal to then prevailing change public opinion. A 1877 novel 'Aşk-ıVatan' (Love of Country) talking about homesickness of a female slave written by Zafer Hanım is supposed to be first novel by first Turkish female writer.

In Namık Kemal's first (1876) novel İntibah (Awakening), a woman named Fatma buys a slave girl Dilaşub, to distract her son Ali from another woman Mahpeyker. When the slave girl Dilaşub fulfils her duty of distraction, Fatma the owner resales her at the slightest doubt of her taking an interest in another man. Aksit says, Dilaşub is depicted as a good in character but weak submissive slave girl, who pays the price for the weaknesses of others, since Fatma manipulates her own son's plus slave girls life by buying and selling at her own convenience. Aksit maintains the early Ottoman male novel writers' focused on themes sympathizing with slave girls depicting their lives from childhood to their transformation in their womanhood, like wise Ahmet Mithat's depiction of his protagonist Rakım goes on to educate his slave girl Canan and marries her. Author Halit Ziya, in his (1886–1887) novel Sefile (The Miserable) describes an adventurous slave girl Mazlume (feminine name for 'Oppressed') who gets sold and resold to good as well as bad people but fails to overcome her fate being a slave girl.

In Samipaşazade Sezai's 1888 novel Sergüzeşt ("Life story" or "Adventure") the slave girl named Dilber is also bought and resold from one family to another, and over a period of time Dilber grows to become an attractive young woman from weak young girl. Aksit says, ironically, while being weak and girly largely protects Dilber from wanted and unwanted sexual advances, her beauty and passage to womanhood prove to be a fatal recipe in combination with slavery, in one of the owner's house where she arrives as an attractive young woman, the young man first ignores and mocks her and then begins painting her picture, manipulating her like his toy. She revolts and cries and he sees that she is in fact a human being. Later they fall in love. However, his mother, the lady of the house, sells Dilber in the market to prevent the love between a slave and a lord, and her love draws her to step of suicide.

While novelist Fatma Aliye (1862 – 1936), progressive for her times, viewed sexual slavery (along with polytheism) as forms of exploitation, according to Zeynep Direk, still Aliye's response is insufficient from feminist point of view due to Aliye's focus on defending Ottomanism and Islamism since Aliye plays down coercion, servitude, oppression, and sexual exploitation aspects of female slavery and talks about female slavery in idyllic and romantic terms and does not support abolishing of institution of slavery even though legally abolished before Fatma Aliye's birth in 1847, though it was still in vogue in practice. Still boundaries of female slavery in Aliyes novels are fluid, in one novel Muhadarat, for example, a non-slave woman even though married to a wealthy man sales herself into slavery to flee from the husband, in another novel Enin family wants their son to marry their female slave but the son is in love with some one else so declines to marry with their female slave, in one another novel Dar'ul Muallimat, character Refet, a daughter of a poor female slave, attends school (Dar'ul Muallimat) to become a teacher.

According to Seteney Nil Dogan, the second generation of nationalist Circassian diaspora of 1970s explored and criticized Circassians and Turks for human sale, arranged and involuntary marriages through their periodicals and activism. In 1975 in Circassian magazine Yamçı a circassian female author Karden D., expressed her hope that emancipation of Circassian woman from image as of a commodity and a product that is being sold with the maximum price is not very distant. Kanuko Cemil's following poem authored in the same magazine in 1976 is an example of the often themes of forced marriage and human sale in the periodicals published by the Circassian diaspora nationalists in the 1970s:

  

Dogan and Toledano say that post 2000 discourse in descendants of slavery is of assimilation within Turkish identity with space for cultural diversity. Turkish television drama series, such as Abad Kejayaan, get exported to various Muslim countries, most of which mainly focus on elite part of Ottoman slavery, new generation audience unaware of forms pre-20th-century Islamic sexual slavery, in spite of clearances from Islamic clergy, conservative audiences lobbies to demand showcasing of sanitized versions without any depiction of slave women in Ottoman times and life.

Notes

Linguistics notes

References

Bibliography 

 Gürsel, Burcu.  Dissolving into the Nile, Ottoman Reformism and Maternal Slavery in Sergüzeşt. Work:Narratives of Dislocation in the Arab World. Routledge, 2023. 
 Tuğ, Başak. Politics of Honor in Ottoman Anatolia: Sexual Violence and Socio-Legal Surveillance in the Eighteenth Century. Netherlands, Brill, 2017. 
 Faroqhi, Suraiya. Women in the Ottoman Empire: A Social and Political History. United Kingdom, Bloomsbury Publishing, 2023. 
 Ipsirli Argit, Betül, et al. Slaves and Slave Agency in the Ottoman Empire. Germany, Bonn University Press, 2020.
 
 A Monument to Medieval Syrian Book Culture  Ashrafīya The Library of Ibn Abd al-Haˉ dıˉ - -Konrad Hirschler  Series Editor: Carole Hillenbrand Edinburgh University Press 2020 Page 33
 King, Charles. The Ghost of Freedom: A History of the Caucasus. United Kingdom, Oxford University Press, 2008.
 Kizilov, Mikhail B. "The Black Sea and the Slave Trade: The Role of Crimean Maritime Towns in the Trade in Slaves and Captives in the Fifteenth to Eighteenth Centuries1". Critical Readings on Global Slavery. Leiden, The Netherlands: Brill, 2017. 
 A Spectrum of Unfreedom: Captives and Slaves in the Ottoman Empire ~ Leslie Peirce Central European University Press, 2021 
 Ahmed, Leila. "Chapter 6 Medieval Islam". Women and Gender in Islam: Historical Roots of a Modern Debate, New Haven: Yale University Press, 2021, pp. 102–124. 
Beyond the Exotic: Women's Histories in Islamic Societies. United States, Syracuse University Press, 2021.
Concubines and Courtesans: Women and Slavery in Islamic History edited by Matthew S. Gordon, Kathryn A. Hain
Powell, Eve Troutt. Tell This in My Memory: Stories of Enslavement from Egypt, Sudan, and the Ottoman Empire. United States, Stanford University Press, 2012.
 Conquered Populations in Early Islam Non-Arabs, Slaves and the Sons of Slave Mothers  Elizabeth Urban
 Toledano, Ehud R.. As If Silent and Absent: Bonds of Enslavement in the Islamic Middle East. United Kingdom, Yale University Press, 2007.
 
 

 
 
 

Sexual slavery
Human commodity auctions
Wartime sexual violence
Violence against women
Islam and slavery
Slave concubines
History of women in Turkey